Cephetola maculata, the macular epitola, is a butterfly in the family Lycaenidae. It is found in Ivory Coast, the Republic of the Congo, the Central African Republic, the Democratic Republic of the Congo and Uganda.

References

Butterflies described in 1926
Poritiinae